Signal peptide peptidase-like 2A, also known as SPPL2A, is a human gene.

Function 

This gene is a member of the signal peptide peptidase-like protease (SPPL) family and encodes a lysosomal/late endosomal membrane protein with the conserved active site motifs 'YD' and 'GxGD' in adjacent transmembrane domains (TMDs). This protein plays a role in innate and adaptive immunity by cleaving TNFα in activated dendritic cells. A pseudogene of this gene also lies on chromosome 15.

References

Further reading